In 1980 the British and Irish Lions rugby union team toured South Africa (including one game in Windhoek, South West Africa, the future Namibia). The tour was not a success for the Lions, as they lost the first three tests before salvaging some pride with a win in the fourth. The team did however win all their 14 non-international matches. The Lions were captained by Bill Beaumont.

Political controversy
The tour went ahead in the face of opposition from the British Government and groups opposed to sporting contact with the apartheid regime in South Africa. Britain was a signatory to the 1977 Gleneagles Agreement in which Commonwealth governments agreed to discourage sporting contacts with South Africa. The Government of the Republic of Ireland were also against the tour. The Four Home Unions committee which organises Lions tours decided to go ahead with the planned tour, despite this opposition, in November 1979 and the rugby unions of England (RFU), Ireland (IRFU), Scotland (SRU) and Wales (WRU) all approved the tour by January 1980.

Touring party, injuries and replacements
Of the 30 players originally selected, ten had previous Lions tour experience. Derek Quinnell had toured New Zealand in 1971 and 1977; Andy Irvine and Fran Cotton had toured South Africa in 1974 and New Zealand in 1977 while Bruce Hay, Bill Beaumont, Allan Martin, Graham Price, Jeff Squire, Peter Wheeler and Clive Williams had all toured New Zealand in 1977. Elgan Rees, added to the party before it left the UK, and Phil Orr, a replacement during the tour, had also toured in 1977. Quinnell was selected despite not playing in the 1980 Five Nations Championship; he had also toured in 1971 when yet to be capped by Wales.

The tour party was disrupted by an unusually high number of injuries and replacements throughout the 10-week-long tour. Eight players flew to South Africa to reinforce the original 30 tourists; Gareth Williams, Tony Ward, Ian Stephens, John Robbie, Phil Orr, Andy Irvine, Paul Dodge and Steve Smith.

Smith joined the tour as cover prior to the final test after Patterson was injured and did not appear in any games. Irvine was in the original 30 selected tourists but withdrew due to injury prior to leaving the UK. He was replaced by Elgan Rees but joined the tour later when Slemen withdrew.

Nine players left the tour early, including Mike Slemen who went home due to family illness. The eight players who were ruled out by injury were Rodney O'Donnell (neck), David Richards (shoulder), Gareth Davies (shoulder and knee), Terry Holmes (shoulder and knee), Stuart Lane (knee), Phil Blakeway (rib) and Fran Cotton (suspected heart trouble). Lane's injury occurred after 55 seconds of the opening game and gave him the shortest career of any Lions tourist. He never played international rugby again. O'Donnell's neck injury ended his rugby career completely. Colin Patterson suffered a knee injury in the penultimate game against Griqualand West which also proved career-ending.

Squad

Management

 Manager Syd Millar (Ireland)
 Coach Noel Murphy (Ireland)
 Team Doctor Jack Matthews (Wales)

Backline

Fullbacks

 Rodney O'Donnell (St. Mary's College and Ireland)
 Bruce Hay (Boroughmuir and Scotland)
 Andy Irvine (Heriots FP and Scotland) as replacement

Wings

 Mike Slemen (Liverpool and England)
 John Carleton (Orrell and England)
 Elgan Rees (Neath and Wales)
 Peter Morgan (Llanelli and Wales)

Centres

 Jim Renwick (Hawick and Scotland)
 Ray Gravell (Llanelli and Wales)
 David Richards (Swansea and Wales)
 Clive Woodward (Leicester and England)
 Paul Dodge (Leicester and England) as replacement

Flyhalves

 Gareth Davies (Cardiff and Wales)
 Ollie Campbell (Old Belvedere and Ireland)
 Tony Ward (Garryowen and Ireland) as replacement

Scrumhalves

 Terry Holmes (Cardiff and Wales)
 Colin Patterson (Instonians and Ireland)
 John Robbie (Greystones RFC and Ireland) as replacement
 Steve Smith (Sale and England) as replacement

Forwards

Hookers

 Peter Wheeler (Leicester and England)
 Alan Phillips (Cardiff and Wales)

Props

 Fran Cotton (Sale and England)
 Clive Williams (Swansea and Wales)
 Ian Stephens (Bridgend and Wales) as replacement
 Phil Orr (Old Wesley and Ireland) as replacement
 Graham Price (Pontypool and Wales)
 Phil Blakeway (Gloucester and England)

Locks

 Bill Beaumont (capt) (Fylde and England)
 Maurice Colclough (Angoulême and England)
 Alan Tomes (Hawick and Scotland)
 Allan Martin (Aberavon and Wales)

Loose forwards

 John O'Driscoll (London Irish and Ireland)
 Colm Tucker (Shannon and Ireland)
 Jeff Squire (Pontypool and Wales)
 Stuart Lane (Cardiff and Wales)
 Derek Quinnell (Llanelli and Wales)
 John Beattie (Glasgow Academicals and Scotland)
 Gareth Williams (Bridgend and Wales) as replacement

Results

The matches

First Test

South Africa: Gysie Pienaar, Ray Mordt, David Smith, Willie du Plessis, Gerrie Germishuys, Naas Botha, Divan Serfontein, Morne du Plessis (c), Theuns Stofberg, Rob Louw, Louis Moolman, Moaner van Heerden, Martiens le Roux, Willie Kahts, Richard Prentis

Lions: O'Donnell, Carleton (replaced by Gravell), Richards, Renwick, Slemen, Ward, Patterson, Quinnell, O'Driscoll, Squire, Colclough, Beaumont (c), Price, Wheeler, Williams

Second Test

South Africa: Gysie Pienaar, Ray Mordt, David Smith, Willie du Plessis, Gerrie Germishuys, Naas Botha, Divan Serfontein, Morné du Plessis (c), Theuns Stofberg, Rob Louw (replaced by Thys Burger), Louis Moolman, Kevin de Klerk, Martiens le Roux, Willie Kahts, Richard Prentis 

Lions: Irvine, Carleton, Gravell, Woodward, Hay, Davies (replaced by Campbell), Patterson, Quinnell, O'Driscoll, Squire, Colclough, Beaumont (c), Price, Wheeler, Williams

Third Test

South Africa: Gysie Pienaar, Ray Mordt, David Smith, Willie du Plessis, Gerrie Germishuys, Naas Botha, Divan Serfontein, Morné du Plessis (c), Theuns Stofberg, Rob Louw, Louis Moolman, Moaner van Heerden, Martiens le Roux, Willie Kahts (replaced by Ewoud Malan), Richard Prentis 

Lions: Irvine, Woodward, Gravell, Dodge, Hay, Campbell, Patterson, Squire, O'Driscoll, Tucker, Colclough, Beaumont (c), Price, Wheeler, Williams

Fourth Test

South Africa: Gysie Pienaar, Ray Mordt, David Smith, Willie du Plessis, Gerrie Germishuys, Naas Botha, Divan Serfontein, Morné du Plessis (c), Theuns Stofberg, Rob Louw, Louis Moolman, Moaner van Heerden, Martiens le Roux, Ewoud Malan, Richard Prentis 

Lions: Irvine, Carleton, Gravell, Dodge, Hay, Campbell, Robbie, Squire, O'Driscoll, Tucker, Colclough, Beaumont (c), Price, Wheeler, Williams

References 

Carwyn James and Chris Rea (1980) Injured pride: the Lions in South Africa (Arthur Barker)

External links 
1980 British Lions tour at Official Lions Website

British & Irish Lions tours of South Africa
British Lions tour
Rugby union tours of Namibia
Rugby union and apartheid
British Lions Tour To South Africa, 1980
Lions tour
Lions tour
Sports scandals in England
Sports scandals in Scotland
Sports scandals in Ireland
Sports scandals in Wales